Animation Lab was an animation studio based in Jerusalem and Los Angeles.

Founded in 2006, and backed by Israeli Venture Capital firm Jerusalem Venture Partners (JVP), the studio was developing its first feature film, The Wild Bunch, as the first feature-length CGI animation film produced in Israel. The story was to involve genetically modified cornstalks trying to take over a meadow populated by common wildflowers. Philip LaZebnik was hired to write the screenplay, and Alexander Williams was slated to make his directorial debut.

Animation Lab closed in 2013.

References

External links
Official Site

American animation studios
Israeli animation studios
Mass media companies established in 2006
Israeli companies established in 2006
Companies based in Jerusalem
Companies based in Los Angeles
Mass media companies disestablished in 2013
2013 disestablishments in Israel